Gubernatorial elections in 2021 were held on a single-voting day, September 19, along with the elections to the 8th State Duma, Russia's lower house. Offices of the heads of 12 constituent entities of the Federation were contested. By decision of the Central Election Commission of Russia, voting was held for three days in a row — September 17, 18, and 19, 2021.

List

Direct elections 
All incumbent governors have won.

Vote in parliament 
Unlike other gubernatorial elections, voting for the head of Dagestan was scheduled on 14 October 2021.

References 

Gubernatorial elections in Russia
2021 elections in Russia
2021 Russian gubernatorial elections